Baryphas is a genus of jumping spiders that was first described by Eugène Louis Simon in 1902.

Species
 it contains five species, found only in Africa:
Baryphas ahenus Simon, 1902 (type) – Southern Africa
Baryphas eupogon Simon, 1902 – São Tomé and Príncipe
Baryphas galeatus (Simon, 1902) – Sierra Leone
Baryphas jullieni Simon, 1902 – West Africa
Baryphas scintillans Berland & Millot, 1941 – Ivory Coast, Guinea

References

Salticidae genera
Salticidae
Spiders of Africa